Mulberry School for Girls (known up to 1986 as Tower Hamlets School for Girls) is a secondary comprehensive school and sixth form for girls located in the Shadwell area of the East End of London, England. Approximately 1400 students aged between 11 and 19 years attend Mulberry school. The current headteacher is Vanessa Ogden who joined Mulberry in 2006.  Mulberry School for Girls is the lead school in the Mulberry Schools Trust.

The name of the school derives from a legend of mulberry trees being cultivated by French Huguenots, one of many immigrant groups to settle in East London. The current school uniform takes its colour from the red mulberry fruit.

In 2006 Mulberry school was designated a specialist school for the Arts in English, Media and the Expressive Arts.

In 2015, Mulberry School was visited by the First Lady of the United States, Michelle Obama, who launched her campaign Let Girls Learn and gave a speech to the girls at Mulberry School. The school is now part of a multi-academy trust supporting several schools in the London Borough of Tower Hamlets.

Headteachers
Doctor Ogden, Vanessa Ogden, the CEO and original head teacher of Mulberry school for girls. She is also the CEO of Mulberry Shorditch, Mulberry Stepney Green and NCT.

Notable pupils
Notable people to have attended the school include:
Apsana Begum – Labour MP

References

External links 
 Mulberry School for Girls School Website

Secondary schools in the London Borough of Tower Hamlets
Girls' schools in London
Academies in the London Borough of Tower Hamlets